Tagaküla may refer to several places in Estonia:
Tagaküla, Harju County, village in Estonia
Tagaküla, Võru County, village in Estonia